The heats for the women's 200 m breaststroke race at the 2009 World Championships took place in the morning and evening of 30 July and the final took place in the evening session of 31 July at the Foro Italico in Rome, Italy.

Records
Prior to this competition, the existing world and competition records were as follows:

The following records were established during the competition:

Results

Heats

Semifinals

Final

References
Final Results
Semifinals Results
Heats Results

Breaststroke Women's 200 m
2009 in women's swimming